Rhodococcus erythropolis is a bacterium species in the genus Rhodococcus. It is Gram-positive. R. erythropolis has been isolated from the air of the Russian Space Laboratory Mir along with a large number of other microorganisms that steadily accumulated during the lifespan of the station. Rhodococcus bacteria are known to degrade organic compounds contained in the rubber used aboard the space station with specialized enzymes. This can lead to degradation of critical components and necessitates replacement of the parts or preventive measures dealing with microbial contamination.

References

Further reading

Kuhad, Ramesh Chander, and Ajay Singh. Biotechnology for Environmental Management and Resource Recovery. Springer, 2013.
Dworkin, Martin, and Stanley Falkow, eds. The Prokaryotes: Vol. 3:  Archaea. Bacteria: Firmicutes, Actinomycetes. Vol. 3. Springer, 2006.
Sneath, Peter HA, et al. Bergey's manual of systematic bacteriology. Volume 5. Williams & Wilkins, 1986.
Alvarez, Héctor M. Biology of Rhodococcus. Vol. 16. Springer, 2010.

External links 

LPSN
Type strain of Rhodococcus baikonurensis at BacDive -  the Bacterial Diversity Metadatabase

Mycobacteriales
Bacteria described in 2004